Shet may refer to:

 Shet District, a district of Karagandy Province in central Kazakhstan.
 Shett is a title used by some communities originating on western coast of India